The Kamal Kumari Foundation is a charitable trust in Assam  established in 1990 by noted Indian entrepreneur, tea planter and philanthropist Hemendra Prasad Barooah in the fond memory of his mother Kamal Kumari Barooah, the remarkable matriarch of the Khongiya Barooah family of Thengal, Assam. It has been able to achieve acclaim and is renowned in the entire North eastern region of India for its charitable and constructive activities.

Activities
Since its inception, the foundation has been actively participating in the promotion of various fields that includes
Restoring Namghars and Satriya Cultural Centres in various parts of Assam
 Building and renovating public facilities
Sponsoring meritorious students in national institutions of repute
Instituting scholarships for handicapped and needy students
 Offering medical aid to the needy
Financially assisting publication of rare Assamese literary works
Besides the foundation has also borne the full cost of publication of the volume "150 years of Journalism in Assam" which was brought out by the Celebration Committee of 150 years of Journalism in Assam.

Awards
The foundation confers three national awards annually to individual or group with an objective to promote excellence in the field of Science & Technology, Art & Culture and Journalism. The awards are
Kamal Kumari National Award for excellence in Art & Culture and Science & Technology
Siva Prasad Barooah National Award for excellence in Journalism
Each award carries Rs 2 lakh, a trophy, a chadar and a citation.

See also
Kamal Kumari Barooah
Siva Prasad Barooah
Kamal Kumari National Award
Siva Prasad Barooah National Award

References

External links
Official website

Organisations based in Assam
Foundations based in India
Charities based in India
Non-profit organisations based in India
Social welfare charities
1990 establishments in Assam
Organizations established in 1990